San Luis Río Colorado is a city and also the name of its surrounding municipality in the state of Sonora, Mexico. In the 2020 census, the city had a population of 176,685. The city is the fourth-largest community in the state, and the municipality is also the fourth-largest in terms of population. Lying in the northwestern corner of Sonora, the city marks the state border with Baja California. It also stands on the international border with the United States, adjacent to San Luis, Arizona. It is located about 75 km from Mexicali. The municipality covers an area of 8,412.75 km² (3,248.2 sq mi) in the Sonoran Desert.

History 
Awarded city status in July 1958, San Luis Río Colorado serves as the administrative center for the surrounding municipality of the same name.  The city is located on a mesa, characterized by a flat and sandy terrain.

San Luis Río Colorado was once an important inland port for steamers traveling the Colorado from the Gulf of California. Since the early 1900s the Colorado has been completely or nearly completely drained for irrigation. The once-formidable Colorado is usually dry or a small stream.

On Easter Sunday 2010, a 7.2 magnitude earthquake struck the region. The Sears department store (formerly Dorian's) and 5 schools were destroyed, affecting approximately 30,000 people in the region.

San Luis Río Colorado is home to four regional medium-wave radio broadcast stations, among them 1350 XELBL-AM, all of which are popular long-distance reception targets for medium wave DX radio enthusiasts.

Josse, a Mexican Latin beat singer recorded a song called "San Luis Río Colorado" as a tribute to the river.

Climate
San Luis Río Colorado has a desert climate (Köppen climate classification BWh), with extremely hot summers and mild winters; it is one of the hottest and driest cities in Mexico.

Economy
Maquila factories in San Luis Río Colorado include TSE Brakes, Daewoo Electronics, Bose, Flextronics, Yazaki, SANA International, and Gaming Partners International.

Transportation

San Luis Río Colorado Airport is the general aviation airport serving this city. The nearest International airport to San Luis Río Colorado is General Rodolfo Sánchez Taboada International Airport near Mexicali. San Luis Río Colorado has highway connections to other parts of Mexico (State highway 40 and Mexican Federal Highway 2). There is a border crossing with San Luis, Arizona. Several intercity bus companies (including TUFESA) stop at the San Luis Río Colorado bus station.

Notable people
Alfredo Aceves, professional baseball player for the New York Yankees.
Paty Díaz, telenovela actress.
Efrain Escudero, MMA fighter for the UFC.
Jorge Páez, former WBO and IBF Champion.
Azriel Páez, undefeated Welterweight prospect and the son of former Champion Jorge Páez.
Carlos Palomino, former WBC Welterweight Champion and member of the International Boxing Hall of Fame.
Rogelio Medina, boxing Middleweight contender.
Ignacio Mondaca Romero, writer, author of Relatos de Ocio among other books.
Jesús Sánchez García, professional footballer for Club Deportivo Guadalajara.

References

Link to tables of population data from Census of 2005 INEGI: Instituto Nacional de Estadística, Geografía e Informática

External links

La Cronica.com

.
Populated places in Sonora
Populated places in the Sonoran Desert of Mexico
Populated places on the Colorado River